Jennifer Jade Roberts (born March 4, 1991), known professionally as Maliibu Miitch, is an American rapper, songwriter, and entertainer of African American, Vietnamese, and Filipino descent. Born in Charlotte, North Carolina, and raised in New York City, New York since the age of three, Roberts started rapping in 2009 and started releasing songs and freestyles throughout the following years.

In 2013, she released her debut EP titled, Hood Foreign. In 2014, she signed to Island Records and released two singles the following year: "Figure8", produced by Mustard and "Starin at It", produced by Dem Jointz. In 2017, she released a mixtape titled Maliibu Miitch Top 5. In 2018, Roberts released her debut single titled "Give Her Some Money" under Atlantic Records that was produced by Hitmaka.

Early life

Maliibu's mother, Venessa White, was born in Charlotte, North Carolina and raised in New York City, New York. It was there that she met Maliibu's father, Brett Roberts, who was an adopted refugee from Vietnam. When Maliibu was 3 years old, her mother left Charlotte to move to New York City with her other two siblings.

Maliibu began modeling at 17 years old but quickly picked up rapping. In 2011 Maliibu made it into Jim Jones Hustle In the Morning music video which fueled her desire to rap even more.

Career

In 2009, Maliibu Miitch picked up rapping, and started freestyling in ciphers around her neighborhood in the South Bronx. What started as a hobby for the then 18-year-old rapper ended up helping her land her first record deal in 2011 with Ruff Ryders CEO Darin "Dee" Dean. The deal was co-signed by producer Swizz Beatz.

In 2013, at the age of 21, Maliibu Miitch went independent and started her own label and all-female cooperation. Later that year, she released her debut extended play through Empire, titled Hood Foreign, after her company.

In 2014, Maliibu Miitch signed her second deal, which would become her first major label deal at Island Records. There, she teamed up with a female singer, releasing two singles in 2015: "Figure8," produced by DJ Mustard, and "Starin At It," produced by Dem Jointz. After taking a two-year break from music, Roberts returned in 2017 with her EP, "Top 5," and singles "Gwapamole" and "4 AM".

Within a couple of months, Maliibu Miitch once again landed another deal, this time with Atlantic Records. This was her second major recording deal, but her first-ever solo deal. She released the single, "Give Her Some Money," produced by Hitmaka in 2018. She is currently working with Entertainment One Music to release her debut album.

Influences
Maliibu cites her mother, Lil' Kim, Lauryn Hill, Rihanna, 50 Cent, Jay-Z, Nicki Minaj, Foxy Brown and Jadakiss as her style and rap influences.

Discography

Extended plays

Singles

As a featured artist

References

Atlantic Records artists
Living people
Rappers from the Bronx
1991 births
African-American women rappers
American musicians of Vietnamese descent
American rappers of Filipino descent
21st-century African-American people
21st-century African-American women